Maria Adeodata Pisani (29 December 180625 February 1855) was a Maltese nun whom Pope John Paul II venerated 24 April 2001 (decree of heroic virtues) and beatified 9 May 2001.

The day after John Paul II signed and released the decree on both her virtues and miracle, paving the path for the beatification 9 May 2001, the bishops released a pastoral letter emphasizing the serious difficulties that she had to face, stating that Maria Adeodata Pisani had had "a difficult childhood as her parents did not live together. She renounced and disposed of her wealth, willingly living as a cloistered nun."

Life
The only daughter of Baron Benedetto Pisani Mompalao Cuzkeri and Vincenza Carrano, she was born Maria Teresa Pisani in Naples, Italy on 29 December 1806, and baptized the same day in the Parish of St Mark at Pizzofalcone. Her father held the title of Baron of Frigenuin, one of the oldest and richest baronies in Malta; her mother was Italian.

Her father took to drink and this soon led to marital problems, so much so that whilst Pisani was still a small child her mother left the conjugal house and entrusted the child's care to her mother-in-law, Elisabeth Mamo Mompalao, who lived in Naples. Mompalao was a decent caregiver, but died when her granddaughter was only ten years old. After her grandmother’s death, Pisani was sent to the famous Istituto di Madama Prota, a boarding school in Naples where the daughters of the local aristocracy received their education.

In 1821 her father was involved in the uprising in Naples and sentenced to death. Since he was a British citizen, his sentence was suspended and King Ferdinand II of Naples had him expelled from Naples and deported to the Mediterranean island of Malta. In 1825, Pisani and her mother came to live in Malta, settling in Rabat.

Once in Malta, Pisani decided to become a nun, although her mother preferred that she marry. Besides suffering from delicate health, Pisani had a deformed shoulder, caused, it was testified, by injuries sustained at the hands of a maid who beat her when she lived with her grandmother in Naples. Although her mother tried to find her a suitable husband, Pisani invariably declined such proposals, preferring to lead a quiet life, of attending church and helping the poor. The people who knew her started to comment about her pious behavior.

Upon turning 21, she entered the Benedictine Community in St. Peter’s Monastery and took the name Maria Adeodata ("given by God"). She made her solemn profession two years later. In the cloister, Pisani was a seamstress, sacristan, porter, teacher and novice mistress. Her charity was a benefit to her fellow nuns and to many people outside the cloister as well.

Pisani wrote various works, the most well-known of which is The mystical garden of the soul that loves Jesus and Mary, a collection of her personal reflections between the years 1835 and 1843.

She was abbess from 1851 to 1853 but had to retire from her duties because she suffered from heart problems. She died on 25 February 1855, aged 48, and was buried the next day in the crypt of the Benedictine monastery at Mdina.

Pisani was remembered for her sanctity, love of the poor, self-imposed sacrifices, and ecstasies so complete that she was seen levitating.

Veneration
In 2001 she was beatified by the John Paul II, who cited as the miracle required for her beatification a 24 November 1897 incident in which the abbess Giuseppina Damiani from the Monastery of Saint John the Baptist Subiaco, Italy was suddenly healed of a stomach tumour following her request for Maria Pisani’s intervention.

Pope John Paul II declared her a Blessed on 9 May 2001 at Floriana, Malta, soon followed by the unveiling of a huge portrait of the Blessed — a replica of an original oil painting commissioned in 1898 by Pietro Pace, the Archbishop of Rhodes and Bishop of Malta. The Pontiff also announced that her feast would be celebrated on 25 February, the day of her death.

References

1806 births
1855 deaths
19th-century venerated Christians
19th-century Christian mystics
Beatifications by Pope John Paul II
Benedictine abbesses
Benedictine beatified people
Benedictine mystics
Benedictine nuns
Daughters of barons
Maltese beatified people
Maltese Roman Catholic religious sisters and nuns
Venerated Catholics by Pope John Paul II
Maltese people of Italian descent
People of Campanian descent